Dana is a populated place located in Shasta County, California along County Road A-19 (McArthur Road).  It was established in 1881 and named for Loren Dana.

Dana shares zip code 96028 with Fall River Mills.

References

External links
 Roadside Thoughts

Unincorporated communities in Shasta County, California
Unincorporated communities in California